Alexis Hector Henriquez Charales (1 February 1983) is a Colombian retired professional footballer who played as a defender.

Henriquez is a two time winner of the Copa Libertadores. He first won the title with Once Caldas in 2004 and captained Atlético Nacional to its second title in 2016.

International career
In 2007, Henriquez was called up to the Colombia national team by manager Jorge Luis Pinto, and made his debut in a 1–0 friendly win over Mexico.

Club performance

Statistics accurate as of last match played on 26 November 2016.

1 Includes cup competitions such as Copa Libertadores and Copa Sudamericana.

2 Includes Superliga Colombiana matches.

Honours

Club
Once Caldas
 Categoría Primera A (3): 2003-I, 2009-I, 2010-II
 Copa Libertadores (1): 2004
Atlético Nacional
 Categoría Primera A (3): 2013-I, 2013-II, 2014-I
 Copa Colombia (2): 2012, 2013
 Superliga Colombiana (1): 2012
 Copa Libertadores (1): 2016

References

External links
 

1983 births
Living people
Colombian footballers
Colombia international footballers
Copa Libertadores-winning players
Association football central defenders
Categoría Primera A players
Once Caldas footballers
Atlético Nacional footballers
People from Santa Marta
Sportspeople from Magdalena Department
21st-century Colombian people